Howard County Courthouse may refer to:

 Howard County Courthouse (Arkansas), Nashville, Arkansas
 Howard County Courthouse (Iowa), Cresco, Iowa
 Howard County Courthouse (Maryland), Ellicott City, Maryland
 Howard County Courthouse (Nebraska), St. Paul, Nebraska
 Howard County Courthouse (Texas), Big Spring, Texas, one of Texas' county courthouses